Dwayne Slay (born June 21, 1984) is a former football safety who played collegiate football for the Texas Tech Red Raiders.  Later he also played professionally for the Chicago Bears and Amarillo Dusters and Winnipeg Blue Bombers of the CFL.

Playing career

College
While only playing for one season as a starter at Texas Tech, Slay set a new Big 12 record with eight forced fumbles in a single season. This achievement, along with Slay being one of the top tacklers in the Big 12, contributed to him being named Big 12 Defensive Player of the Year by the Associated Press and First-team All-Big 12 Conference in November, 2005. Slay was also named a First-team All-American by Sports Illustrated in December 2005, the first Red Raider thus selected since Montae Reagor in 1998.

In one game—against the Kansas State Wildcats on October 15, 2005—Slay had two big hits. The first was a tackle on Kansas Statewide receiver Davin Dennis that caused a fumble. Slay later caused another fumble when he hit quarterback Allan Everidge on an up-the-middle draw play that forced Everidge to the turf for several minutes. The Red Raiders won the game 59-20.

Towards the end of the season, ESPN's Mel Kiper, Jr. had Slay as one of his top 25 NFL draft prospects and many believed Slay would, at the very least, go late in the first day of the draft. However, after a poor pro-day workout at the NFL combine, Slay's status dropped significantly.

Professional
Pundits predicted that Dwayne Slay would be drafted by an NFL team in the seventh round of the 2006 NFL Draft; but, after going undrafted, Slay instead signed a free agent contract with the Chicago Bears. Slay was released by the Bears due to injuring his hamstring. The Bears re-signed Slay and put him on the practice squad as a linebacker. He later left the team and was signed by the Amarillo Dusters. Slay moved on to sign with the Winnipeg Blue Bombers, but was later cut and is currently out of football.

Personal life

Following his retirement from football, he returned to Texas. In 2015, he returned to at Texas Tech and completed his bachelor's degree in human sciences. He is the cousin of NFL cornerback Darius Slay.

References

External links 
 Play bio from Texas Tech Athletics
 Slay hit on Davin Dennis
 Slay hit on Allan Everidge
 Associated Press Big 12 Defensive Player of the Year
 Sports Illustrated's 2005 All-America Team

American football safeties
Chicago Bears players
Texas Tech Red Raiders football players
Amarillo Dusters players
Living people
1984 births
All-American college football players
Winnipeg Blue Bombers players
People from Brunswick, Georgia
African-American players of American football
African-American players of Canadian football
American football linebackers
21st-century African-American sportspeople
20th-century African-American people